Dorchester is a town in Grafton County, New Hampshire, United States.  The population was 339 at the 2020 census.

History
Originally granted by Governor Benning Wentworth in 1761, Dorchester was named for Dorchester in Dorset, England. When the recipients failed to take up the grant, it was regranted in 1766, but also without success. Finally, it was regranted by Governor John Wentworth to 72 people on May 1, 1772, and settlement began soon thereafter. The first settlers were Benjamin Rice and Stephen Murch from Hanover, but originally from Connecticut.

When the first census of Dorchester was taken in 1790, there were 175 residents. By 1859, when the population reached 711, there were eleven sawmills, in addition to several clapboard and shingle mills. Charcoal was also manufactured here.

Geography
It is drained by the north-flowing South Branch Baker River and the south-flowing Mascoma River and its tributary, the Indian River. Cummins Pond and Reservoir Pond are in the west. The northeastern half of town which drains to the South Branch of the Baker is part of the Merrimack River watershed, while the southwestern half is part of the Connecticut River watershed.

The town is crossed by New Hampshire Route 118.

Demographics

At the 2000 census there were 353 people, 132 households, and 99 families in the town.  The population density was 7.9 people per square mile (3.0/km).  There were 236 housing units at an average density of 5.3 per square mile (2.0/km).  The racial makeup of the town was 97.17% White, 0.28% African American, 0.28% Native American, 0.85% Asian, 0.85% from other races, and 0.57% from two or more races. Hispanic or Latino of any race were 0.57%.

Of the 132 households 35.6% had children under the age of 18 living with them, 59.8% were married couples living together, 9.8% had a female householder with no husband present, and 25.0% were non-families. 19.7% of households were one person and 6.1% were one person aged 65 or older.  The average household size was 2.67 and the average family size was 3.02.

The age distribution was 27.5% under the age of 18, 5.4% from 18 to 24, 26.3% from 25 to 44, 28.9% from 45 to 64, and 11.9% 65 or older.  The median age was 40 years. For every 100 females, there were 98.3 males.  For every 100 females age 18 and over, there were 95.4 males.

The median household income was $40,833 and the median family income  was $42,292. Males had a median income of $35,000 versus $24,375 for females. The per capita income for the town was $18,940.  About 8.6% of families and 11.3% of the population were below the poverty line, including 17.2% of those under age 18 and 9.5% of those age 65 or over.

Notable people 

 Rufus Blodgett (1834–1910), US senator from New Jersey
 Albert Woodworth (1843–1908), businessman, state legislator

References

External links
 
 New Hampshire Economic and Labor Market Information Bureau Profile

 
Towns in Grafton County, New Hampshire
Towns in New Hampshire